Maidenhead Synagogue is a Reform synagogue based in Maidenhead, Berkshire, England. It serves Berkshire, Buckinghamshire and surrounding districts west of London in the Thames Valley area.

History
Maidenhead Synagogue originated during World War II when many Jewish families were evacuated  to the area from London. It was initially a community with no dedicated building, meeting for prayer in private houses and served by a volunteer rabbi and lay readers. At the war's end, some of the congregation stayed in the area and established a permanent Jewish community, acquiring a house for use as a dedicated synagogue building in 1953.

The synagogue became part of the Reform Movement in 1960, so receiving the services of student rabbis of the Leo Baeck College, among them Jonathan Romain who was appointed as the synagogue's first full-time rabbi in 1980. The synagogue moved to larger premises in 2001 and the congregation has grown to 1831 members. An extension to the synagogue, including a new community centre, was opened in 2017.

Facilities
In addition to being a centre for worship, the synagogue's facilities include a library, a Judaica and kosher shop, a nursery school, a religion school, youth clubs, adult education classes, conversion classes, social activities for adults and children, a café, and a community care scheme.

For members unable to travel to the synagogue, Shabbat evening and Shabbat morning services are streamed live via the Internet.

All members receive by post the synagogue's monthly community magazine, Hadashot (חדשות).

See also
 List of Jewish communities in the United Kingdom
 List of former synagogues in the United Kingdom
 Movement for Reform Judaism

References

External links
Official website
Maidenhead Synagogue on Jewish Communities and Records – UK (hosted by JewishGen)
The Movement for Reform Judaism

1953 establishments in England
Places of worship in Maidenhead
Reform synagogues in the United Kingdom
Religion in Berkshire